Abood Hamam (was born in 1975) is a Syrian photographer, and the only person to expose the Syrian Civil War through his camera to outside world via different internationally broadcasting media. His identity not officially known for last nine consecutive years since 2011. He served Bashar Hafez al-Assad of Syria and his family as a camera man. He also served ISIS in similar way, but in very secured manner. He use pseudonym, Nur Furat when he was sending his pictures to international agencies.

Background

Early life 
Abood Hamam was born in Raqqa. He is born into farmer family, whom want him to become a lawyer or teacher. But unfortunately, as his big brother gave him the Russian Camera, Zenit, he felt in love with photography. He also graduate from School of Photography in Damascus.

Career 
As he graduated from college, at 36, he became a head of photography in Sana, which was a news agency as a propaganda arm of the government. His common duty was recording the official activity of the president Hafez al-Assad and Asma al-Assad, his spouse.

When mass street protest begun in 2011, he recorded his prior photography secretly as the Free Syrian Army's attacks in the Damascus, capital of Syria.

In 2013, after Raqqa fall to the rebels, he left Damascus and returned home.

References 

Living people
1975 births
Syrian photographers
People from Damascus